Bangkok Metropolitan Administration (BMA) General Hospital, popularly known as Klang Hospital (lit: Central Hospital) is a public tertiary hospital in Thailand located on corner of the Luang and Suea Pa Roads, Pom Prap Subdistrict, Pom Prap Sattru Phai District, Bangkok. Klang Hospital is a public hospital operated by the Medical Service Department, Bangkok Metropolitan Administration (BMA), and is regarded as one of the oldest hospitals in Thailand. It is an affiliated hospital of the School of Medicine, Mae Fah Luang University and the Faculty of Medicine Siriraj Hospital, Mahidol University.

History

The hospital was established in 1898 with the royal permission of King Chulalongkorn (Rama V) for the aim of providing of services for large number prostitutes in this area (Chinatown and Phlapphla Chai) in order to prevent the spread of epidemics. The following year, the building was assigned to the Royal Thai Police, and became the Patrol Hospital. During this time, it provided medical services to police officers and conducted autopsies from various cases. At the same time, 36 beds were added for the treatment of prostitutes, following its initial intended purpose. In 1915, the hospital was reassigned to the Medical Services Division of the Ministry of Interior. Eventually, operations were transferred to the BMA. 

On 13 June 2012, the Medical Services Department of the BMA signed an agreement to train medical students of the School of Medicine, Mae Fah Luang University at the hospital under the Collaborative Project to Increase Rural Doctor (CPIRD) Program. Along with Charoenkrung Pracharak Hospital in Bang Kho Laem District, both hospitals form the Medical Education Center of the Medical Services Department, Bangkok Metropolitan Administration (MEC MSD BMA).

See also 

 Health in Thailand
 Healthcare in Thailand
 Hospitals in Thailand

References
This article incorporates material from the corresponding article in the Thai Wikipedia.

External links
 

Pom Prap Sattru Phai district
Hospitals established in 1900
Hospitals in Bangkok
1900 establishments in Siam